Rivière-Héva is a municipality in northwestern Quebec, Canada in the La Vallée-de-l'Or Regional County Municipality. It is named after the Héva River that flows through the municipality.

History
In 1935 as part of the Vautrin Settlement Plan, the place was colonized, originally called Aux Quatre-Coins (French for "At Four Corners"). In 1981, it was incorporated as a municipality.

On August 29, 2009, Rivière-Héva was greatly enlarged when it absorbed the Unorganized Territory of Lac-Fouillac and the western portion of the Unorganized Territory of Lac-Granet.

Demographics
Population trend:
 Population in 2006:
 Rivière-Héva: 1056 (2001 to 2006 population change: -5.6%)
 Lac-Fouillac: 91
 Population in 2001:
 Rivière-Héva: 1119
 Lac-Fouillac: 77
 Population in 1996:
 Rivière-Héva: 1096
 Lac-Fouillac: 174
 Population in 1991:
 Rivière-Héva: 1043
 Lac-Fouillac: 168

Mother tongue:
 English as first language: 0%
 French as first language: 100%
 English and French as first language: 0%
 Other as first language: 0%

References

Municipalities in Quebec
Incorporated places in Abitibi-Témiscamingue